The pygmy moray or Robin's moray (Gymnothorax robinsi) is a moray eel found in coral reefs in the western Pacific and Indian oceans. It was first named by Böhlke in 1997,

References

pygmy moray
Marine fish of Northern Australia
pygmy moray